William Andrew Allison (1850 – January 25, 1887), was an American professional baseball player. In the National Association he was a substitute infielder for the 1872 Brooklyn Eckfords He was the younger brother of Eckfords teammate Andy Allison.

"Billy" Allison previously played for the Eckfords in the second of their four professional seasons, 1870. While the team won 2, tied 1, and lost 12 pro matches, he was one of the second basemen.

After his baseball career Bill Allison served one term as a Brooklyn city alderman, then was appointed an appraiser in the Custom House, a position which he held when he died of heart disease on January 25, 1887, in Brooklyn. He is interred at Cypress Hills Cemetery.

References

External links

Brooklyn Eckfords (NABBP) players
Brooklyn Eckfords players
Burials at Cypress Hills Cemetery
19th-century baseball players
1850 births
1887 deaths